Acianthera adamantinensis is a species of orchid.

References

adamantinensis
Plants described in 1939